The scarlet eggplant is a fruiting plant of the genus Solanum, related to the tomato and eggplant. Its green fruit is known as Gilo (Brazilian Portuguese: Jiló). It was once treated as a distinct species, Solanum gilo, but it is now known to be a cultivar group of Solanum aethiopicum (the Ethiopian Eggplant or nakati).

Gilo was brought to Brazil from West Africa during the slave trade. It is still grown in West Africa, where it is sometimes called "garden eggs."

Widely grown in Brazil, it is normally cooked as a vegetable. The fruit turns orange-red when ripe, but is usually picked and cooked while it is green. In Mizo it is called samtawk.

Varieties, taste and usage
Some varieties, like morro redondo, can have a bitter flavor which is an acquired taste. Solanum gilo 'Black Stream' has black stems and red or orange fruits; it is grown in France as an ornamental, and can be dried for winter decorations.

More information
WFCR http://www.publicbroadcasting.net/wfcr/news.newsmain/article/0/0/1522784/WFCR.Local.Features/Ethnic.Vegetables.in.the.Pioneer.Valley
University of Massachusetts http://www.umassvegetable.org/soil_crop_pest_mgt/articles_html/jilo.html

References

Eggplants

fr:Solanum gilo